Karl Hammes (25 March 1896 – 6 September 1939) was a German operatic baritone, also a fighter pilot in the First and Second World Wars. He worked at the Bayreuth Festival, in Berlin, Cologne, Salzburg and Vienna, among others.

Life and career 
Hammes was born in Zell. After graduating from high school in 1916, Hammes began training as a fighter pilot in the Jagdstaffel 11. He ended the First World War in the rank of major. Afterwards he studied voice at the Hochschule für Musik und Tanz Köln. He made his stage debut at the Cologne Opera in 1925. From 1927, he was a member of the Kroll Opera House in Berlin, where Otto Klemperer conducted. Also in 1927, Hammes appeared at the Bayreuth Festival as Amfortas in Parsifal and as Gunther in the Götterdämmerung. From 1929 to 1935, he was a member of the Vienna State Opera, with appearances at the Salzburg Festival, where he performed the title role in Mozart's Don Giovanni from 1929 to 1931. From 1935, Hammes was a regular guest at the Berlin State Opera from 1935. He was appointed a Kammersänger.

With the outbreak of the Second World War, Hammes was again drafted, as commander. He was involved in the bombing of Warsaw, and was shot down.

Hammes made only few recordings. (as Don Giovanni). Hammes also took part in two films including Königswalzer.

Hammes died in Warsaw on 6 September 1939, at age 43.

See also

References

Sources 
 Uwe Harten: Hammes, Karl in Oesterreichisches Musiklexikon. Inline-edition, Vienna 2002 ff., ; Druckausgabe: volume 2, Austrian Academy of Sciences printing house, Vienna 2003, .
 Alfons Friderichs (Autor): Hammes, Karl, in Persönlichkeiten des Kreises Cochem-Zell. Kliomedia, Trier 2004, .

External links 
 Karl Hammes on Ludwig Maximilian Universität Munich
 
 Karl Hammes on FilmPortal.de
 Karl Hammes on Rheinland-Pfälzische Personendatenbank
 

1896 births
1939 deaths
German male film actors
German male silent film actors
German operatic baritones
Luftstreitkräfte personnel
People from Zell (Mosel)
20th-century German male actors
Luftwaffe personnel killed in World War II
Luftwaffe pilots
German World War I pilots
20th-century German male opera singers
Actors from Rhineland-Palatinate
Military personnel from Rhineland-Palatinate